Aditi Sen De is an Indian scientist, a professor in quantum information and computation group at the Harish-Chandra Research Institute, Allahabad. She is known for her research on quantum information and computation, quantum communication including quantum cryptography, quantum optics and many-body physics. The Council of Scientific and Industrial Research, the apex agency of the Government of India for scientific research, awarded her the Shanti Swarup Bhatnagar Prize for Science and Technology for her contributions to physical sciences in 2018.
She is the first female physicist to be given this honour. In 2022, she was elected as a member of Indian Academy of Sciences  and Indian National Science Academy.

Life and career 

Aditi Sen De was born in Kolkata, India to Lakshmi Dey, a school teacher and Ajit Kumar Dey, a state-government employee. She did her schooling at Sarada Ashrama Balika Bidyalaya, Kolkata, and completed her higher secondary from Sakhawat Memorial Govt. Girls High School, Kolkata in 1992. With a strong passion and high proficiency for mathematics, she joined Bethune College, University of Calcutta to obtain a Bachelor of Science with honours in Mathematics. Subsequently, she joined the prominent Applied Mathematics department of the Rajabazar Science College, University of Calcutta, where she pursued her interests in quantum and statistical physics. She received her master's degree in 1997, and after a short period of research work in India, moved to Gdańsk, Poland to work with Marek Żukowski at the University of Gdańsk, where she received her PhD in January 2004. Following her doctoral studies she moved to Hannover, Germany as a Humboldt Research Fellow to work with Maciej Lewenstein at the Leibniz University. Thereafter, she joined ICFO - The Institute of Photonic Sciences at Barcelona, Spain to continue her research on quantum information theory, condensed matter and statistical physics. She won the prestigious Ramón y Cajal research fellowship during her time in Spain. Upon returning to India in 2008, she briefly joined the School of Physical Sciences at Jawaharlal Nehru University as an Assistant Professor in Physics, before moving to Harish-Chandra Research Institute,  Allahabad in 2009, where she is currently a Professor in Physics. Aditi Sen De has published more than 100 research articles in eminent peer-reviewed journals, and has also collaborated with several world-renowned physicists.

She is married to fellow physicist Ujjwal Sen, who is also a Professor of Physics at Harish-Chandra Research Institute in Allahabad, India. They have a daughter, Anusyuta Sen.

Research 

Aditi Sen De started her research in the field of quantum information theory during her postgraduate studies in Kolkata, and went on obtain her doctorate in 2004 at the University of Gdańsk. The field of quantum information and computation was still in its early days, and Gdańsk, Poland was one of the main research centres in the world, where important work on the theory of quantum entanglement was being done. In collaboration with her supervisor Marek Żukowski, and other eminent physicists such as Ryszard Horodecki, Paweł Horodecki, Michał Horodecki and her husband, Ujjwal Sen, she worked on some fundamental problems on entanglement theory, quantum cryptography and quantum communication. After her stint in Gdańsk, she joined the group of Maciej Lewenstein in Hannover, Germany and later in ICFO - The Institute of Photonic Sciences in Castelldefels near Barcelona, Spain, where she spend a considerable period of her early research career. During this period, she consolidated her research on quantum information, while contributing heavily to new research directions that were opening in the interface of quantum information and many-body quantum physics. In particular, her research focused on the study of quantum phase transitions using entanglement as a key figure of merit. After a brief stint as a faculty member in Jawaharlal Nehru University, she moved to Harish-Chandra Research Institute in Allahabad, where along with physicists Ujjwal Sen and Arun Kumar Pati, she started the Quantum Information and Computation group in 2009, under the Physics Division at the institute. Over the last few years, several young researchers have completed their doctoral as well as postdoctoral research at the group, resulting in more than 50 publications in well-known journals in physics. The group has also hosted several conferences and workshops, with participants and speakers from all around the world.

In recent years, Aditi Sen De has contributed significantly to the understanding of quantum information and communication, in particular the formulation of a computable entanglement measure and a novel density-matrix recursion method. Her work also involves understanding the theory of quantum channels, the security of quantum cryptography and quantification of quantum correlations.

Awards and honours 
In January of 2022, she was elected to Indian Academy of Sciences. She has been elected member of another prestigious science society, Indian National Science Academy in October of 2022.  The Council of Scientific and Industrial Research awarded her the Shanti Swarup Bhatnagar Prize, one of the highest Indian science awards in 2018. She is the first women recipient of this Prize in the Physical Science category. In 2012, she won the biennial Buti Foundation Award, given by the Indian Physics Association to young scientists who have made outstanding contributions in the area of Theoretical Physics, Astrophysics or Biophysics. She has also been a recipient of the prestigious Ramón y Cajal fellowship in Spain and the Humboldt Research Fellowship, given by the Alexander von Humboldt Foundation in Germany.

See also 

 Quantum information
 Harish-Chandra Research Institute

References 

Recipients of the Shanti Swarup Bhatnagar Award in Physical Science
Scientists from West Bengal
Living people
Indian condensed matter physicists
1974 births
Scientists from Allahabad
Indian women physicists
Bengali physicists
20th-century Indian physicists
Women scientists from Uttar Pradesh
Scholars from Uttar Pradesh
20th-century Indian women scientists
Women scientists from West Bengal